Yang Jie is the name of:

 Yang Jie (director) (杨洁), television director and producer
 Yang Jie (volleyball) (杨婕), volleyball player
 Yang Jie (basketball) (杨洁), basketball player
 Yang Jie (murder victim) (杨婕), Chinese peidu mama murdered in Singapore